Tonny Temple (born September 2, 2000) is an American soccer player who plays for Ottawa Spirit.

Career 
Temple appeared as an amateur player for United Soccer League side Bethlehem Steel FC during their 2018 season via the Philadelphia Union academy.

References

External links 
 

2000 births
Living people
American soccer players
Philadelphia Union II players
Association football forwards
Soccer players from Pennsylvania
USL Championship players
NC State Wolfpack men's soccer players
Akron Zips men's soccer players
Ottawa Spirit